The Roman Republic was a form of government of Rome and the era of the classical Roman civilization when it was run through public representation of the Roman people. Beginning with the overthrow of the Roman Kingdom (traditionally dated to 509 BC) and ending in 27 BC with the establishment of the Roman Empire, Rome's control rapidly expanded during this period—from the city's immediate surroundings to hegemony over the entire Mediterranean world.

Roman society under the Republic was primarily a cultural mix of Latin and Etruscan societies, as well as of Sabine, Oscan, and Greek cultural elements, which is especially visible in the Ancient Roman religion and its Pantheon. Its political organization developed, at around the same time as direct democracy in Ancient Greece, with collective and annual magistracies, overseen by a senate. The top magistrates were the two consuls, who had an extensive range of executive, legislative, judicial, military, and religious powers. Even though a small number of powerful families (called gentes) monopolised the main magistracies, the Roman Republic is generally considered one of the earliest examples of representative democracy. Roman institutions underwent considerable changes throughout the Republic to adapt to the difficulties it faced, such as the creation of promagistracies to rule its conquered provinces, or the composition of the senate.

Unlike the Pax Romana of the Roman Empire, the Republic was in a state of quasi-perpetual war throughout its existence. Its first enemies were its Latin and Etruscan neighbours as well as the Gauls, who even sacked the city in 387 BC. The Republic nonetheless demonstrated extreme resilience and always managed to overcome its losses, however catastrophic. After the Gallic Sack, Rome conquered the whole Italian peninsula in a century, which turned the Republic into a major power in the Mediterranean. The Republic's greatest strategic rival was Carthage, against which it waged three wars. The Punic general Hannibal famously invaded Italy by crossing the Alps and inflicted on Rome three devastating defeats at Trebia, Lake Trasimene and Cannae, but the Republic once again recovered and won the war thanks to Scipio Africanus at the Battle of Zama in 202 BC. With Carthage defeated, Rome became the dominant power of the ancient Mediterranean world. It then embarked on a long series of difficult conquests, defeating Philip V and Perseus of Macedon, Antiochus III of the Seleucid Empire, the Lusitanian Viriathus, the Numidian Jugurtha, the Pontic king Mithridates VI, Vercingetorix of the Averni tribe of Gaul, and the Egyptian queen Cleopatra.

At home, the Republic similarly experienced a long streak of social and political crises, which ended in several violent civil wars. At first, the Conflict of the Orders opposed the patricians, the closed oligarchic elite, to the far more numerous plebs, who finally achieved political equality in several steps during the 4th century BC. Later, the vast conquests of the Republic disrupted its society, as the immense influx of slaves they brought enriched the aristocracy, but ruined the peasantry and urban workers. In order to address this issue, several social reformers tried to pass agrarian laws. The Gracchi brothers managed to pass some reforms, although eventually they, Saturninus, and Clodius Pulcher were all murdered by their opponents, aristocratic senators. The reformers are often given the label Populares, and the senators fighting the reforms Optimates. Mass slavery also caused three Servile Wars; the last of them was led by Spartacus, a skillful gladiator who ravaged Italy and left Rome fearful until his defeat in 71 BC. In this context, the last decades of the Republic were marked by the rise of great generals, who exploited their military conquests and the factional situation in Rome to gain control of the political system. Marius (between 105 and 86 BC), then Sulla (between 82 and 78 BC) dominated the Republic in turn with both using their military control to purge their political opponents.

These tensions led to further civil wars; the first between the two generals Julius Caesar and Pompey. Despite his victory and appointment as dictator for life, Caesar was assassinated in 44 BC. Caesar's heir Octavian and lieutenant Mark Antony defeated Caesar's assassins Brutus and Cassius in 42 BC, but they eventually split up thereafter. The final defeat of Mark Antony alongside his ally and lover Cleopatra at the Battle of Actium in 31 BC, and the Senate's grant of extraordinary powers to Octavian as Augustus in 27 BC – which effectively made him the first Roman emperor – marked the end of the Republic.

History

Founding

Rome had been ruled by monarchs since its foundation. These monarchs were elected, for life, by men who made up the Roman Senate. The last Roman monarch was named Lucius Tarquinius Superbus (colloquially known as "Tarquin the Proud") and in traditional histories Tarquin was expelled from Rome in 509 BC because his son, Sextus Tarquinius, raped a noblewoman named Lucretia (who had afterwards taken her own life). The husband of Lucretia, Lucius Tarquinius Collatinus, together with Tarquin the Proud's nephew, Lucius Junius Brutus, mustered support from the Senate and Roman army and forced the former monarch into exile to Etruria.

After this incident, the Senate agreed to abolish kingship. In turn, most of the former functions of the king were transferred to two separate consuls. These consuls were elected to office for a term of one year; each was capable of acting as a "check" on his colleague (if necessary) through the power of veto that the former kings had held. Furthermore, if a consul were to abuse his powers in office, he could be prosecuted when his term expired. Lucius Junius Brutus and Lucius Tarquinius Collatinus became first consuls of the Roman Republic (despite Collatinus' role in the creation of the Republic, he belonged to the same family as the former king and thus was forced to abdicate his office and leave Rome. He thereafter was replaced as co-consul by Publius Valerius Publicola.)

Most modern scholarship describes these events as the quasi-mythological detailing of an aristocratic coup within Tarquin's own family, not a popular revolution. They fit a narrative of a personal vengeance against a tyrant leading to his overthrow, which was common among Greek cities, and such a pattern of political vengeance was theorized by Aristotle.

Rome in Latium

Early campaigns
According to Rome's traditional histories, Tarquin made several attempts to retake the throne, including the Tarquinian conspiracy, which involved Brutus' own sons, the war with Veii and Tarquinii and finally the war between Rome and Clusium; but none succeeded.

The first Roman republican wars were wars of both expansion and defence, aimed at protecting Rome itself from neighbouring cities and nations and establishing its territory in the region. Initially, Rome's immediate neighbours were either Latin towns and villages, or else tribal Sabines from the Apennine hills beyond. One by one Rome defeated both the persistent Sabines and the local cities, both those under Etruscan control and those that had cast off their Etruscan rulers. Rome defeated its rival Latin cities in the Battle of Lake Regillus in 496 BC, the Battle of Ariccia in 495 BC, the Battle of Mount Algidus in 458 BC, and the Battle of Corbio in 446 BC. However it suffered a significant defeat at the Battle of the Cremera in 477 BC wherein it fought against the most important Etruscan city of Veii; this defeat was later avenged at the Battle of Veii in 396 BC, wherein Rome destroyed the city. By the end of this period, Rome had effectively completed the conquest of their immediate Etruscan and Latin neighbours, and also secured their position against the immediate threat posed by the nearby Apennine hill tribes.

Plebeians and patricians

Beginning with their revolt against Tarquin, and continuing through the early years of the Republic, Rome's patrician aristocrats were the dominant force in politics and society. They initially formed a closed group of about 50 large families, called gentes, who monopolised Rome's magistracies, state priesthoods and senior military posts. The most prominent of these families were the Cornelii, followed by the Aemilii, Claudii, Fabii, and Valerii. The power, privilege and influence of leading families derived from their wealth, in particular from their landholdings, their position as patrons, and their numerous clients.

The vast majority of Roman citizens were commoners of various social degrees. They formed the backbone of Rome's economy, as smallholding farmers, managers, artisans, traders, and tenants. In times of war, they could be summoned for military service. Most had little direct political influence over the Senate's decisions or the laws it passed, including the abolition of the monarchy and the creation of the consular system. During the early Republic, the plebs (or plebeians) emerged as a self-organised, culturally distinct group of commoners, with their own internal hierarchy, laws, customs, and interests.

Plebeians had no access to high religious and civil office, and could be punished for offences against laws of which they had no knowledge. For the poorest, one of the few effective political tools was their withdrawal of labour and services, in a "secessio plebis"; they would leave the city en masse, and allow their social superiors to fend for themselves. The first such secession occurred in 494 BC, in protest at the abusive treatment of plebeian debtors by the wealthy during a famine. The patrician Senate was compelled to give them direct access to the written civil and religious laws and to the electoral and political process. To represent their interests, the plebs elected tribunes, who were personally sacrosanct, immune to arbitrary arrest by any magistrate, and had veto power over the passage of legislation.

Celtic invasion of Italy

By 390, several Gallic tribes were invading Italy from the north. The Romans were alerted to this when a particularly warlike tribe, the Senones, invaded two Etruscan towns close to Rome's sphere of influence. These towns, overwhelmed by the enemy's numbers and ferocity, called on Rome for help. The Romans met the Gauls in pitched battle at the Battle of Allia River around 390–387 BC. The Gauls, led by the chieftain Brennus, defeated the Roman army of approximately 15,000 troops, pursued the fleeing Romans back to Rome, and sacked the city before being either driven off or bought off.

Roman expansion in Italy

Wars against Italian neighbours

From 343 to 341, Rome won two battles against their Samnite neighbours, but were unable to consolidate their gains, due to the outbreak of war with former Latin allies.

In the Latin War (340–338), Rome defeated a coalition of Latins at the battles of Vesuvius and the Trifanum. The Latins submitted to Roman rule.

A Second Samnite War began in 327. The fortunes of the two sides fluctuated, but from 314, Rome was dominant, and offered progressively unfavourable terms for peace. The war ended with Samnite defeat at the Battle of Bovianum (305). By the following year, Rome had annexed most Samnite territory and began to establish colonies there; but in 298 the Samnites rebelled, and defeated a Roman army, in a Third Samnite War. Following this success they built a coalition of several previous enemies of Rome. However, the war eventually ended with a Roman victory in 290.

At the Battle of Populonia, in 282, Rome finished off the last vestiges of Etruscan power in the region.

Rise of the plebeian nobility

In the 4th century, plebeians gradually obtained political equality with patricians. The starting point was in 400, when the first plebeian consular tribunes were elected; likewise, several subsequent consular colleges counted plebeians (in 399, 396, 388, 383, and 379). The reason behind this sudden gain is unknown, but it was limited as patrician tribunes retained preeminence over their plebeian colleagues. In 385, the former consul and saviour of the besieged Capitol Marcus Manlius Capitolinus is said to have sided with the plebeians, ruined by the sack and largely indebted to patricians. Livy tells that Capitolinus sold his estate to repay the debt of many of them, and even went over to the plebs, the first patrician to do so. Nevertheless, the growing unrest he had caused led to his trial for seeking kingly power; he was consequently sentenced to death and thrown from the Tarpeian Rock.

Between 376 and 367, the tribunes of the plebs Gaius Licinius Stolo and Lucius Sextius Lateranus continued the plebeian agitation and pushed for an ambitious legislation, known as the Leges Liciniae Sextiae. Two of their bills attacked patricians' economic supremacy by creating legal protection against indebtedness and forbidding excessive use of public land, as the Ager publicus was monopolised by large landowners. The most important bill opened the consulship to plebeians. Other tribunes controlled by the patricians vetoed the bills, but Stolo and Lateranus retaliated by vetoing the elections for five years while being continuously re-elected by the plebs, resulting in a stalemate. In 367, they carried a bill creating the Decemviri sacris faciundis, a college of ten priests, of whom five had to be plebeians, thereby breaking patricians' monopoly on priesthoods. Finally, the resolution of the crisis came from the dictator Camillus, who made a compromise with the tribunes: he agreed to their bills, while they in return consented to the creation of the offices of praetor and curule aediles, both reserved to patricians. Lateranus also became the first plebeian consul in 366; Stolo followed in 361.

Soon after, plebeians were able to hold both the dictatorship and the censorship, since former consuls normally filled these senior magistracies. The four time consul Gaius Marcius Rutilus became the first plebeian dictator in 356 and censor in 351. In 342, the tribune of the plebs Lucius Genucius passed his leges Genuciae, which abolished interest on loans, in a renewed effort to tackle indebtedness, required the election of at least one plebeian consul each year, and prohibited a magistrate from holding the same magistracy for the next ten years or two magistracies in the same year. In 339, the plebeian consul and dictator Quintus Publilius Philo passed three laws extending the powers of the plebeians. His first law followed the lex Genucia by reserving one censorship to plebeians, the second made plebiscites binding on all citizens (including patricians), and the third stated that the Senate had to give its prior approval to plebiscites before becoming binding on all citizens (the lex Valeria-Horatia of 449 had placed this approval after the vote). Two years later, Publilius ran for the praetorship, probably in a bid to take the last senior magistracy closed to plebeians, which he won.

During the early republic, senators were chosen by the consuls from among their supporters. Shortly before 312, the lex Ovinia transferred this power to the censors, who could only remove senators for misconduct, thus appointing them for life. This law strongly increased the power of the Senate, which was by now protected from the influence of the consuls and became the central organ of government. In 312, following this law, the patrician censor Appius Claudius Caecus appointed many more senators to fill the new limit of 300, including descendants of freedmen, which was deemed scandalous. He also incorporated these freedmen in the rural tribes. His tribal reforms were nonetheless rescinded by the next censors, Quintus Fabius Maximus and Publius Decius Mus, his political enemies. Caecus also launched a vast construction program, building the first aqueduct, the Aqua Appia, and the first Roman road, the Via Appia.

In 300, the two tribunes of the plebs Gnaeus and Quintus Ogulnius passed the lex Ogulnia, which created four plebeian pontiffs, therefore equalling the number of patrician pontiffs, and five plebeian augurs, outnumbering the four patricians in the college. Eventually the Conflict of the Orders ended with the last secession of the plebs around 287. The details are not known precisely as Livy's books on the period are lost. Debt is once again mentioned by ancient authors, but it seems that the plebs revolted over the distribution of the land conquered on the Samnites. A dictator named Quintus Hortensius was appointed to negotiate with the plebeians, who had retreated to the Janiculum Hill, perhaps to dodge the draft in the war against the Lucanians. Hortensius passed the lex Hortensia which re-enacted the law of 339, making plebiscites binding on all citizens, while also removing any need for the Senate's prior approval. Popular assemblies were by now sovereign; this put an end to the crisis and to plebeian agitation for 150 years.

These events were a political victory of the wealthy plebeian elite who exploited the economic difficulties of the plebs for their own gain, hence why Stolo, Lateranus, and Genucius bound their bills attacking patricians' political supremacy with debt-relief measures. They had indeed little in common with the mass of plebeians; for example, Stolo was fined for having exceeded the limit on land occupation he had fixed in his own law. As a result of the end of the patrician monopoly on senior magistracies, many small patrician gentes faded into history during the 4th and 3rd centuries due to the lack of available positions; the Verginii, Horatii, Menenii, Cloelii all disappear, even the Julii entered a long eclipse. They were replaced by plebeian aristocrats, of whom the most emblematic were the Caecilii Metelli, who received 18 consulships until the end of the Republic; the Domitii, Fulvii, Licinii, Marcii, or Sempronii were as successful. About a dozen remaining patrician gentes and twenty plebeian ones thus formed a new elite, called the nobiles, or Nobilitas.

Pyrrhic War

By the beginning of the 3rd century, Rome had established herself as the major power in Italy, but had not yet come into conflict with the dominant military powers of the Mediterranean: Carthage and the Greek kingdoms. In 282, several Roman warships entered the harbour of Tarentum, breaking a treaty between the Republic and the Greek city, which forbade the gulf to Roman naval ships. It triggered a violent reaction from the Tarentine democrats, sinking some of the ships; they were in fact worried that Rome could favour the oligarchs in the city, as it had done with the other Greek cities under its control. The Roman embassy sent to investigate the affair was insulted and war was promptly declared. Facing a hopeless situation, the Tarentines (together with the Lucanians and Samnites) appealed to Pyrrhus, the ambitious king of Epirus, for military aid. A cousin of Alexander the Great, he was eager to build an empire for himself in the western Mediterranean and saw Tarentum's plea as a perfect opportunity towards this goal.

Pyrrhus and his army of 25,500 men (with 20 war elephants) landed in Italy in 280; he was immediately named strategos autokrator by the Tarentines. Publius Valerius Laevinus, the consul sent to face him, rejected the king's negotiation offers, as he had more troops and hoped to cut the invasion short. The Romans were nevertheless defeated at Heraclea, as their cavalry were afraid of Pyrrhus' elephants. Pyrrhus then marched on Rome, likely not to besiege the city, but rather to trigger defections from Rome's Etruscan allies. However, the Romans concluded a peace in the north and moved south with reinforcements, placing Pyrrhus in danger of being flanked by two consular armies. Pyrrhus withdrew to Tarentum. His adviser, the orator Cineas, made a peace offer before the Roman Senate, asking Rome to return the land it took from the Samnites and Lucanians, and liberate the Greek cities under its control. The offer was rejected after Appius Caecus – the old censor of 312 – spoke against it in a celebrated speech, which was the earliest recorded by the time of Cicero. In 279, Pyrrhus met the consuls Publius Decius Mus and Publius Sulpicius Saverrio at the Battle of Asculum, which remained undecided for two days. Finally, Pyrrhus personally charged into the melee and won the battle but at the cost of an important part of his troops; he allegedly said "if we are victorious in one more battle with the Romans, we shall be utterly ruined."

He escaped the Italian deadlock by answering a call for help from Syracuse, where tyrant Thoenon was desperately fighting an invasion from Carthage. Pyrrhus could not let them take the whole island as it would have compromised his ambitions in the western Mediterranean and so declared war on them. At first, his Sicilian campaign was an easy triumph; he was welcomed as a liberator in every Greek city on his way, even receiving the title of king (basileus) of Sicily. The Carthaginians lifted the siege of Syracuse before his arrival, but he could not entirely oust them from the island as he failed to take their fortress of Lilybaeum. His harsh rule, especially the murder of Thoenon, whom he did not trust, soon led to a widespread antipathy among the Sicilians; some cities even defected to Carthage. In 275, Pyrrhus left the island before he had to face a full-scale rebellion. He returned to Italy, where his Samnite allies were on the verge of losing the war, despite their earlier victory at the Cranita hills. Pyrrhus again met the Romans at the Battle of Beneventum. This time, the consul Manius Dentatus was victorious and even captured eight elephants. Pyrrhus then withdrew from Italy, but left a garrison in Tarentum, to wage a new campaign in Greece against Antigonus II Gonatas of Macedonia. His death in battle at Argos in 272 forced Tarentum to surrender to Rome. Since it was the last independent city of Italy, Rome now dominated the entire Italian peninsula, and won an international military reputation.

Punic Wars and expansion in the Mediterranean

First Punic War (264–241 BC)

Rome and Carthage were initially on friendly terms; Polybius details three treaties between them, the first dating from the first year of the Republic, the second from 348. The last was an alliance against Pyrrhus. However, tensions rapidly built up after the departure of the Epirote king. Between 288 and 283, Messina in Sicily was taken by the Mamertines, a band of mercenaries formerly employed by Agathocles. They plundered the surroundings until Hiero II, the new tyrant of Syracuse, defeated them (in either 269 or 265). Carthage could not let him take Messina, as he would have controlled its strait, and garrisoned the city. In effect under a Carthaginian protectorate, the remaining Mamertines appealed to Rome to regain their independence. Senators were divided on whether to help them or not, as it would have meant war with Carthage, since Sicily was in its sphere of influence (the treaties furthermore forbade the island to Rome), and Syracuse. A supporter of war, the consul Appius Claudius Caudex (Caecus' brother) turned to one of the popular assemblies to get a favourable vote by promising plunder to the voters. After the assembly ratified an alliance with the Mamertines, Caudex was dispatched to cross the strait and lend aid.

Messina fell under Roman control quickly. Syracuse and Carthage, at war for centuries, responded with an alliance to counter the invasion and blockaded Messina; Caudex, however, defeated Hiero and Carthage separately. His successor M' Valerius Maximus Corvinus landed with a strong 40,000 men army that conquered eastern Sicily, which prompted Hiero to shift his allegiance and forge a long lasting alliance with Rome. In 262, the Romans moved to the southern coast and besieged Akragas. In order to raise the siege, Carthage sent reinforcements, including 60 elephants – the first time they used them, but still lost the battle. Nevertheless, as Pyrrhus before, Rome could not take all of Sicily because Carthage's naval superiority prevented them from effectively besieging coastal cities, which could receive supplies from the sea. Using a captured Carthaginian ship as blueprint, Rome therefore launched a massive construction program and built 100 quinqueremes in only two months, perhaps through an assembly line. They also invented a new device, the corvus, a grappling engine which enabled a crew to board on an enemy ship. The consul for 260, Cn. Cornelius Scipio Asina, lost the first naval skirmish of the war against Hannibal Gisco at Lipara, but his colleague C. Duilius won a great victory at Mylae. He destroyed or captured 44 ships, and was the first Roman to receive a naval triumph, which also included captive Carthaginians for the first time. Although Carthage was victorious on land at Thermae in Sicily, . The consul L. Cornelius Scipio (Asina's brother) captured Corsica in 259; his successors won the naval battles of Sulci in 258, Tyndaris in 257, and Cape Ecnomus in 256.

In order to hasten the end of the war, the consuls for 256 decided to carry the operations to Africa, on Carthage's homeland. The consul Marcus Atilius Regulus landed on the Cap Bon peninsula with about 18,000 soldiers. He captured the city of Aspis, repulsed Carthage's counter-attack at Adys, and took Tunis. The Carthaginians supposedly sued him for peace, but his conditions were so harsh that they continued the war instead. They hired Spartan mercenaries, led by Xanthippus, to command their troops. In 255, the Spartan general marched on Regulus, still encamped at Tunis, who accepted the battle to avoid sharing the glory with his successor. However, the flat land near Tunis favoured the Punic elephants, which crushed the Roman infantry on the Bagradas plain; only 2,000 soldiers escaped, and Regulus was captured. The consuls for 255 nonetheless won a new sounding naval victory at Cape Hermaeum, where they captured 114 warships. This success was spoilt by a storm that annihilated the victorious navy: 184 ships of 264 sank, 25,000 soldiers and 75,000 rowers drowned. The corvus considerably hindered ships' navigation, and made them vulnerable during tempest. It was abandoned after another similar catastrophe took place in 253 (150 ships sank with their crew). These disasters prevented any significant campaign between 254 and 252.

Hostilities in Sicily resumed in 252, with the taking of Thermae by Rome. Carthage countered the following year, by besieging L. Caecilius Metellus, who held Panormos (now Palermo). The consul had dug trenches to counter the elephants, which once hurt by missiles turned back on their own army, resulting in a great victory for Metellus, who exhibited some captured beasts in the Circus Maximus. Rome then besieged the last Carthaginian strongholds in Sicily, Lilybaeum and Drepana, but these cities were impregnable by land. Publius Claudius Pulcher, the consul of 249, recklessly tried to take the latter from the sea, but he suffered a terrible defeat; his colleague Lucius Junius Pullus likewise lost his fleet off Lilybaeum. Without the corvus, Roman warships had lost their advantage. By now, both sides were drained and could not undertake large scale operations; the number of Roman citizens who were being called up for war had been reduced by 17% in two decades, a result of the massive bloodshed. The only military activity during this period was the landing in Sicily of Hamilcar Barca in 247, who harassed the Romans with a mercenary army from a citadel he built on Mt. Eryx.

Finally, unable to take the Punic fortresses in Sicily, Rome tried to decide the war at sea and built a new navy, thanks to a forced borrowing from the rich. In 242, 200 quinqueremes under consul Gaius Lutatius Catulus blockaded Drepana. The rescue fleet from Carthage arrived the next year, but was largely undermanned and soundly defeated by Catulus. Exhausted and unable to bring supplies to Sicily, Carthage sued for peace. Catulus and Hamilcar negotiated a treaty, which was somewhat lenient to Carthage, but the Roman people rejected it and imposed harsher terms: Carthage had to pay 1000 talents immediately and 2200 over ten years, and evacuate Sicily. The fine was so high that Carthage could not pay Hamilcar's mercenaries, who had been shipped back to Africa. They revolted during the Mercenary War, which Carthage suppressed with enormous difficulty. Meanwhile, Rome took advantage of a similar revolt in Sardinia to seize the island from Carthage, in violation of the peace treaty. This stab-in-the-back led to permanent bitterness in Carthage.

Second Punic War

After its victory, the Republic shifted its attention to its northern border as the Insubres and Boii were threatening Italy. Meanwhile, Carthage compensated the loss of Sicily and Sardinia with the conquest of Southern Hispania (up to Salamanca), and its rich silver mines. This enterprise was the work of the Barcid family, headed by Hamilcar, the former commander in Sicily. Hamilcar nonetheless died against the Oretani in 228; his son-in-law Hasdrubal the Fair – the founder of Carthago Nova – and his three sons Hannibal, Hasdrubal, and Mago, succeeded him. This rapid expansion worried Rome, which concluded a treaty with Hasdrubal in 226, stating that Carthage could not cross the Ebro river. However, the city of Saguntum, located in the south of the Ebro, appealed to Rome in 220 to act as arbitrator during a stasis. Hannibal dismissed Roman rights on the city, and took it in 219. At Rome, the Cornelii and the Aemilii considered the capture of Saguntum a casus belli, and won the debate against Fabius Maximus Verrucosus, who wanted to negotiate. An embassy carrying an ultimatum was sent to Carthage, asking its senate to condemn Hannibal's deeds. The Carthaginian refused, triggering the Second Punic War.

Initially, the Republic's plan was to carry war outside Italy, sending the consuls P. Cornelius Scipio to Hispania and Ti. Sempronius Longus to Africa, while their naval superiority prevented Carthage from attacking from the sea. This plan was thwarted by Hannibal's bold move to Italy. In May 218, he crossed the Ebro with a large army of about 100,000 soldiers and 37 elephants. He passed in Gaul, crossed the Rhone, then the Alps, possibly through the Col de Clapier (2,491 meters high). This famous exploit cost him almost half of his troops, but he could now rely on the Boii and Insubres, still at war with Rome. Publius Scipio, who had failed to block Hannibal on the Rhone, sent his elder brother Gnaeus with the main part of his army in Hispania according to the initial plan, and went back to Italy with the rest to resist Hannibal in Italy, but he was defeated and wounded near Pavia.

Hannibal then marched south and won three outstanding victories. The first one was on the banks of the Trebia in December 218, where he defeated the other consul Ti. Sempronius Longus thanks to his brother Mago, who had concealed some elite troops behind the legions and attacked them from the rear once fighting Hannibal. More than half of the Roman army was lost. Hannibal then ravaged the country around Arretium to lure the new consul C. Flaminius into a trap, at Lake Trasimene. He had hidden his troops in the hills surrounding the lake and attacked Flaminius when he was cornered on the shore. This clever ambush resulted in the death of the consul and the complete destruction of his army of 30,000 men. In 216, the new consuls L. Aemilius Paullus and C. Terentius Varro mustered the biggest army possible, with eight legions – some 80,000 soldiers, twice as many as the Punic army – and confronted Hannibal, who was encamped at Cannae, in Apulia. Despite his numerical disadvantage, Hannibal used his heavier cavalry to rout the Roman wings and envelop their infantry, whom he annihilated. In terms of casualties, the Battle of Cannae was the worst defeat in the history of Rome: only 14,500 soldiers escaped; Paullus was killed as well as 80 senators. Soon after, the Boii ambushed the army of the consul-elect for 215, L. Postumius Albinus, who died with all his army of 25,000 men in the Battle of Silva Litana.

These disasters triggered a wave of defection among Roman allies, with the rebellions of the Samnites, Oscans, Lucanians, and Greek cities of Southern Italy. In Macedonia, Philip V also made an alliance with Hannibal in order to take Illyria and the area around Epidamnus, occupied by Rome. His attack on Apollonia started the First Macedonian War. In 215, Hiero II of Syracuse died of old age, and his young grandson Hieronymus broke the long alliance with Rome to side with Carthage. At this desperate point, the aggressive strategy against Hannibal advocated by the Scipiones was abandoned in favour of delaying tactics that avoided direct confrontation with him. Its main proponents were the consuls Q. Fabius Maximus Verrucosus, nicknamed Cunctator ("the delayer"), M. Claudius Marcellus, and Q. Fulvius Flaccus. The "Fabian strategy" favoured a slow reconquest of the lost territories, since Hannibal could not be everywhere to defend them. Although he remained invincible on the battlefield, defeating all the Roman armies on his way, he could not prevent Claudius Marcellus from taking Syracuse in 212 after a long siege, nor the fall of his bases of Capua and Tarentum in 211 and 209.

In Hispania, the situation was overall much better for Rome. This theatre was mostly commanded by the brothers Publius and Gnaeus Scipio, who won the battles of Cissa in 218, soon after Hannibal's departure, and Dertosa against his brother Hasdrubal in 215, which enabled them to conquer the eastern coast of Hispania. In 211, however, Hasdrubal and Mago Barca successfully turned the Celtiberian tribes that supported the Scipiones, and attacked them simultaneously at the Battle of the Upper Baetis, in which the Scipiones brothers died. Publius' son, the future Scipio Africanus, was then elected with a special proconsulship to lead the Hispanic campaign. He soon showed outstanding skills as a commander, winning a series of battles with ingenious tactics. In 209, he took Carthago Nova, the main Punic base in Hispania, then defeated Hasdrubal at the Battle of Baecula the next year. After his defeat, Carthage ordered Hasdrubal to reinforce his brother in Italy. Since he could not use ships, he followed the same route as his brother through the Alps, but this time the surprise. The consuls M. Livius Salinator and C. Claudius Nero were awaiting him and defeated him in the Battle of the Metaurus, where Hasdrubal died. It was the turning point of the war. The attrition campaign had indeed worked well: Hannibal's troops were now depleted; he only had one elephant left (Surus) and retreated to Bruttium, on the defensive. In Greece, Rome contained Philip V without devoting too many forces by setting an alliance with the Aetolian League, Sparta, and Pergamon, which also prevented Philip from aiding Hannibal. The war with Macedon resulted in a stalemate, with the Treaty of Phoenice signed in 205.

In Hispania, Scipio continued his successful campaign at the battles of Carmona in 207, and Ilipa (now Seville) in 206, which ended the Punic threat on the peninsula. Elected consul in 205, he convinced the Senate to cancel the Fabian strategy and instead to invade Africa with the support of the Numidian king Masinissa, who had defected to Rome. Scipio landed in Africa in 204. He took Utica and then won the Battle of the Great Plains, which prompted Carthage to recall Hannibal from Italy and open peace negotiations with Rome. The talks nevertheless failed because Scipio wanted to impose harsher terms on Carthage, in order to avoid it from rising again as a threat. Hannibal was therefore sent to face Scipio at Zama. Scipio could now use the heavy Numidian cavalry of Massinissa – which had hitherto been so successful against Rome – to rout the Punic wings, then flank the infantry, as Hannibal had done at Cannae. Defeated for the first time, Hannibal convinced the Carthaginian Senate to pay the war indemnity, which was even harsher than that of 241: 10,000 talents in 50 instalments. Carthage furthermore had to give up all its elephants, all its fleet but ten triremes, all its possessions outside its core territory in Africa (what is now Tunisia), and could not declare war without Roman authorisation. In effect, Carthage was condemned to be a minor power, while Rome recovered from a desperate situation to dominate the western Mediterranean.

Roman supremacy in the Greek East

Rome's preoccupation with its war with Carthage provided an opportunity for Philip V of the kingdom of Macedonia, located in the north of the Greek peninsula, to attempt to extend his power westward. Philip sent ambassadors to Hannibal's camp in Italy, to negotiate an alliance as common enemies of Rome. However, Rome discovered the agreement when Philip's emissaries were captured by a Roman fleet. The First Macedonian War saw the Romans involved directly in only limited land operations, but they ultimately achieved their objective of occupying Philip and preventing him from aiding Hannibal.

The past century had seen the Greek world dominated by the three primary successor kingdoms of Alexander the Great's empire: Ptolemaic Egypt, Macedonia and the Seleucid Empire. In 202, internal problems led to a weakening of Egypt's position, disrupting the power balance among the successor states. Macedonia and the Seleucid Empire agreed to an alliance to conquer and divide Egypt. Fearing this increasingly unstable situation, several small Greek kingdoms sent delegations to Rome to seek an alliance. The delegation succeeded, even though prior Greek attempts to involve Rome in Greek affairs had been met with Roman apathy. Our primary source about these events, the surviving works of Polybius, do not state Rome's reason for getting involved. Rome gave Philip an ultimatum to cease his campaigns against Rome's new Greek allies. Doubting Rome's strength – a reasonable doubt, given Rome's performance in the First Macedonian War – Philip ignored the request, and Rome sent an army of Romans and Greek allies, beginning the Second Macedonian War. Despite his recent successes against the Greeks and earlier successes against Rome, Philip's army buckled under the pressure from the Roman-Greek army. In 197, the Romans decisively defeated Philip at the Battle of Cynoscephalae, and Philip was forced to give up his recent Greek conquests. The Romans declared the "Peace of the Greeks", believing that Philip's defeat now meant that Greece would be stable. They pulled out of Greece entirely, maintaining minimal contacts with their Greek allies.

With Egypt and Macedonia weakened, the Seleucid Empire made increasingly aggressive and successful attempts to conquer the entire Greek world. Now not only Rome's allies against Philip, but even Philip himself, sought a Roman alliance against the Seleucids. The situation was made worse by the fact that Hannibal was now a chief military advisor to the Seleucid emperor, and the two were believed to be planning an outright conquest not just of Greece, but of Rome itself. The Seleucids were much stronger than the Macedonians had ever been, because they controlled much of the former Persian Empire, and by now had almost entirely reassembled Alexander the Great's former empire.

Fearing the worst, the Romans began a major mobilization, all but pulling out of recently pacified Spain and Gaul. They even established a major garrison in Sicily in case the Seleucids ever got to Italy. This fear was shared by Rome's Greek allies, who had largely ignored Rome in the years after the Second Macedonian War, but now followed Rome again for the first time since that war. A major Roman-Greek force was mobilized under the command of the great hero of the Second Punic War, Scipio Africanus, and set out for Greece, beginning the Roman–Seleucid War. After initial fighting that revealed serious Seleucid weaknesses, the Seleucids tried to turn the Roman strength against them at the Battle of Thermopylae (as they believed the 300 Spartans had done centuries earlier). Like the Spartans, the Seleucids lost the battle, and were forced to evacuate Greece. The Romans pursued the Seleucids by crossing the Hellespont, which marked the first time a Roman army had ever entered Asia. The decisive engagement was fought at the Battle of Magnesia, resulting in a complete Roman victory. The Seleucids sued for peace, and Rome forced them to give up their recent Greek conquests. Although they still controlled a great deal of territory, this defeat marked the decline of their empire, as they were to begin facing increasingly aggressive subjects in the east (the Parthians) and the west (the Greeks). Their empire disintegrated into a rump over the course of the next century, when it was eclipsed by Pontus. Following Magnesia, Rome again withdrew from Greece, assuming (or hoping) that the lack of a major Greek power would ensure a stable peace. In fact, it did the opposite.

Conquest of Greece

In 179, Philip died. His talented and ambitious son, Perseus, took the throne and showed a renewed interest in conquering Greece. With her Greek allies facing a major new threat, Rome declared war on Macedonia again, starting the Third Macedonian War. Perseus initially had some success against the Romans. However, Rome responded by sending a stronger army. This second consular army decisively defeated the Macedonians at the Battle of Pydna in 168 and the Macedonians capitulated, ending the war.

Convinced now that the Greeks (and therefore the rest of the region) would not have peace if left alone, Rome decided to establish its first permanent foothold in the Greek world, and divided Macedonia into four client republics. Yet, Macedonian agitation continued. The Fourth Macedonian War, 150 to 148 BC, was fought against a Macedonian pretender to the throne who was again destabilizing Greece by trying to re-establish the old kingdom. The Romans swiftly defeated the Macedonians at the second battle of Pydna.

The Achaean League, seeing the direction of Roman policy trending towards direct administration, met at Corinth and declared war "nominally against Sparta but in reality against Rome". They were swiftly defeated: in 146, the same year as the destruction of Carthage, Corinth was besieged and destroyed, which forced the league's surrender. After nearly a century of constant crisis management in Greece, which always led back to internal instability and war when she withdrew, Rome decided to divide Macedonia into two new directly-administered Roman provinces, Achaea and Macedonia.

Third Punic War

Carthage never recovered militarily after the Second Punic War, but quickly did so economically and the Third Punic War that followed was in reality a simple punitive mission after the neighbouring Numidians allied to Rome robbed and attacked Carthaginian merchants. Treaties had forbidden any war with Roman allies; viewing defence against banditry as "war action", Rome decided to annihilate the city of Carthage. Carthage was almost defenceless, and submitted when besieged. However, the Romans demanded complete surrender and removal of the city into the desert hinterland far from any coastal or harbour region; the Carthaginians refused. The city was besieged, stormed, and completely destroyed.

Ultimately, all of Carthage's North African and Iberian territories were acquired by Rome. Punic Carthage was gone, but the other Punic cities in the western Mediterranean flourished under Roman rule. Carthage would eventually be rebuilt by the Romans one hundred years later as a Roman colony by order of Julius Cæsar. It flourished, becoming one of the largest cities in the Roman Empire, and the largest and most important one in Africa.

Social troubles and first civil war

Views on the structural causes of the Republic's collapse differ. One of the enduring theses is that Rome's expansion destabilized its social organization between conflicting interests; the Senate's policymaking, blinded by its own short-term self-interest, alienated large portions of society from it, who then joined powerful generals who sought to overthrow the system. Two other theses have challenged this thesis. The first notices that nobody actively sought the destruction of the republic – in fact, politicians clung ever harder to the traditional political system in its waning years, – but pins blame on the Romans' inability to conceive of alternatives to the traditional republican system. The second instead stresses the continuity of the republic: until its disruption by Caesar's civil war and the following two decades of civil war created conditions for autocratic rule and made return to the republic impossible. In this view, "civil war caused the fall of the republic, not vice versa".

A core cause of the Republic's eventual demise was the loss of elite's cohesion from : the ancient sources called this moral decay from wealth and the hubris of Rome's domination of the Mediterranean. Modern sources have proposed multiple causes of elite cohesion, including wealth inequality and a growing unwillingness by aristocrats to transgress political norms, especially in the aftermath of the Social War.

The Gracchi

In the winter of 138–37, a first slave uprising, known as the First Servile War, broke out in Sicily. After initial successes, the slaves led by Eunus and Cleon were defeated by M. Perperna and P. Rupilius in 132 BC.

In this context, Tiberius Gracchus was elected plebeian tribune in 133 BC. He attempted to enact a law to limit the amount of land that any individual could own and establish a commission, on which Gracchus and members of his family would sit, distribute to public lands to poor rural plebs. The aristocrats, who stood to lose an enormous amount of money, were bitterly opposed to this proposal. Tiberius submitted this law to the Plebeian Council, but the law was vetoed by a fellow tribune named Marcus Octavius. Tiberius induced the plebs to depose Octavius from his office on the justification that Octavius acted contrary to the manifest will of the people, a position that was unprecedented and constitutionally dubious: carried to its logical end, this theory would remove all constitutional restraints on the popular will, and put the state under the absolute control of a temporary popular majority. His law was enacted and took effect, but, when Tiberius ostentatiously stood for re-election to the tribunate, he was deliberately murdered by a faction in the senate.

Tiberius' brother Gaius was elected tribune ten years later in 123 and re-elected for 122. Recalling the memory of his brother, he induced the plebs to reinforce rights of appeal to the people against capital extrajudicial punishments and institute reforms to improve the welfare of the people. While the ancient sources tend to "conceive Gracchus' legislation as an elaborate plot against the authority of the Senate... he showed no sign of wanting to replace the Senate in its normal functions". Amid wide-ranging and popular reforms to create grain subsidies, change jury pools, establish and require the Senate to assign provinces before elections, Gaius then proposed a law which would grant citizenship rights to Rome's Italian allies. This last proposal was not popular with the plebeians and he lost much of his support. He stood for election to a third term in 121 but was defeated. During violent protests over repeal of an ally's colonisation bill, the Senate moved the senatus consultum ultimum against him, resulting in his death, with many others, on the Aventine. His legislation (like that of his brother) survived; the Roman aristocracy disliked the Gracchi's agitation but acceded to their policies.

In 121, the province of Gallia Narbonensis was established after the victory of Quintus Fabius Maximus over a coalition of Arverni and Allobroges in southern Gaul in 123. The city of Narbo was founded there in 118 by Lucius Licinius Crassus.

Rise of Marius

The Jugurthine War of 111–104 was fought between Rome and the North African kingdom of Numidia (in current-day Algeria and Tunisia). In 118, its king, Micipsa, died. He was succeeded by two legitimate sons, Adherbal and Hiempsal, and an illegitimate son, Jugurtha. Micipsa divided his kingdom between these three sons upon his death. Jugurtha, however, turned on his brothers, killing Hiempsal and driving Adherbal out of Numidia. While Jugurtha usurped the throne, Adherbal fled to Rome for assistance.

Numidia had been a loyal ally of Rome since the Punic Wars. Initially, Rome mediated a division of the country between the two brothers. However, Jugurtha eventually renewed his offensive, leading to a long and inconclusive war with Rome. He also bribed several Roman commanders (and at least two tribunes) before and during the war. His nemesis, Gaius Marius, a legate from a virtually unknown provincial family, returned from the war in Numidia and was elected consul in 107 over the objections of the aristocratic senators, relying on support from the businessmen and poor. Marius had the Numidian command reassigned to himself by plebiscite and, with the capture of Jugurtha at the end of a long campaign, ended the war; in the aftermath, the Romans largely withdrew from the province after installing a client king. Marius' victory played on existing themes of senatorial corruption and incompetence, contrasted especially against the military failure of senatorial leadership in the Cimbric war.

The Jugurthine War constituted the final Roman pacification of northern Africa, after which Rome largely ceased expansion on the continent after reaching natural barriers of desert and mountain.

The Cimbrian War (113–101) was a far more serious affair than the earlier Gallic clashes in 121. The Germanic tribes of the Cimbri and the Teutons migrated from northern Europe into Rome's northern territories, and clashed with Rome and her allies. The defeat of various aristocrats in the conflict, along with Marius' reputation for military victory, led to his holding five successive consulships with little to enable him to lead armies against the threat. At the Battle of Aquae Sextiae and the Battle of Vercellae, Marius led the Roman armies which virtually annihilated both tribes, ending the threat.

During the Cimbric war, further conflicts embroiled the Republic: a Second Servile War waged in Sicily from 104 to 101; a campaign was waged against pirates in Cilicia; Rome campaigned in Thrace, adding lands to the province of Macedonia; and Lycaonia was annexed to Rome.

First civil wars

In 91, the Social War broke out between Rome and its former allies in Italy: the main causes of the war were Roman encroachment on allied lands due to the Republic's land redistribution programmes, harsh Roman treatment of the non-citizen allies, and Roman unwillingness to share in the spoils of the empire won by Roman and Italian arms. After the assassination, in Rome, of a conservative tribune who sought to grant the Italians citizenship, the allies took up arms: most ancient writers explain the conflict in terms of demands for full citizenship; however, contemporary rebel propaganda coins indicate it may have been a primarily anti-Roman secessionist movement. The Romans, in the event, were able to stave off military defeat by conceding the main point almost immediately, tripling the number of citizens. More recent scholarship also has stressed the importance of the war on the allies in destabilising Roman military affairs by blurring the distinction between Romans and foreign enemies: "it may as well be argued that the [Social war] created the self-seeking unprincipled soldier as the converse".

Further civil conflict emerged, starting in 88. One of the consuls that year, L. Cornelius Sulla was assigned to take an army against the Pontic king Mithridates. The local governor there was defeated. However, C. Marius induced a tribune to promulgate legislation reassigning Sulla's command to Marius. Sulla responded by suborning his army, marching on Rome (the city was undefended but politically outraged), and declaring Marius and eleven of his allies outlaws before departing east to war with Mithridates. Marius, who had escaped into exile, returned, and with L. Cornelius Cinna, took control of the city.

After the Marians took control of the city, they started to purge their political enemies. They elected, in irregular fashion, Marius and Cinna to the consulship of 86 BC. Marius, however, died a fortnight after assuming office. Cinna took control of the state: his policies are unclear and the record is muddled by Sulla's eventual victory. The Cinnan regime declared Sulla a public enemy and ostensibly replaced him in command in the east. Instead of cooperating with his replacement, which Sulla viewed as illegitimate, he made peace with Mithridates and prepared to return to Italy. By 85 BC, the Cinnans in Rome started preparations to defend the peninsula from invasion.

In 83, he returned from the east with a small but experienced army. Initial reactions were negative across the peninsula, but after winning a number of victories he was able to overcome resistance and capture the city. In the Battle of the Colline Gate, just outside Rome, Sulla's army defeated the Marian defenders and then proceeded to "run riot... killing for profit, pleasure, or personal vengeance anyone they pleased". He then instituted procedures to centralise the killing, creating lists of proscribed persons who could be killed for their property without punishment. After establishing political control, Sulla had himself made dictator and passed a series of constitutional reforms intended to strengthen the position of the magistrates and the senate in the state and replace custom with new rigid statute laws enforced by new permanent courts. Sulla resigned the dictatorship in 81 after election as consul for 80. He then retired and died 78 BC.

Sullan republic

During Sulla's civil war, Cn. Pompey Magnus had served as a young general under Sulla's overall command. He served the Sullan regime during a short conflict triggered by the republic's own consul, M. Aemilius Lepidus, in 77 BC and afterwards led troops successfully against the remaining anti-Sullan forces in the Sertorian War; he brought the war successfully to a close in 72 BC.

While Pompey was in Spain, the Republic faced agitation both foreign and domestic. The main domestic political struggle was the restoration of tribunician powers stripped during Sulla's dictatorship. After rumours of a pact between Sertorius' ostensible republic-in-exile, Mithridates, and various Mediterranean pirate groups, the Sullan regime feared encirclement and stepped up efforts against the threats: they reinforced Pompey in Spain and fortified Bithynia. In spring 73 BC, Mithridates did so, invading Bithynia.

In 73, a slave uprising started in southern Italy under Spartacus, a gladiator, who defeated the local Roman garrisons and four legions under the consuls of 72. At the head of some seventy thousand men, Spartacus led them in a Third Servile War – they sought freedom by escape from Italy – before being defeated by troops raised by M. Licinius Crassus. After the slaves were defeated by Crassus and then Pompey, who was returning to Rome from Spain, they bickered over who deserved credit. Although Pompey and Crassus were rivals, they were elected to a joint consulship in 70. During their consulship, they brought legislation to dismantle – with little opposition – the tribunician disabilities imposed by Sulla's constitutional reforms. They also shepherded legislation to settle the contentious matter of jury reform.

L. Licinius Lucullus, one of Sulla's most able lieutenants, had fought against Mithridates during the first Mithridatic war before Sulla's civil war. Mithridates also had fought Rome in a second Mithridatic war (83–82 BC). Rome for its part seemed equally eager for war and the spoils and prestige that it might bring. After his invasion of Bithynia in 73, Lucullus was assigned against Mithridates and his Armenian ally Tigranes the Great in Asia Minor. Fighting a war of manoeuvre against Mithridates' supply lines, Lucullus was able force Mithridates from an attempted siege of Cyzicus and pursue him into Pontus and thence into Armenia. After defeat forced the Romans from large parts of Armenia and Pontus in 67, Lucullus was replaced in command by Pompey. Pompey who had recently secured and competed an extraordinary command to rid the Mediterranean of pirates, moved against Mithridates in 66. Defeating him in battle and securing the submission of Tigranes, Mithridates fled to Crimea, where he was betrayed and killed by his son Pharnaces in 63. Pompey remained in the East to pacify and settle Roman conquests in the region, also extending Roman control south to Judaea.

End of the Republic

First Triumvirate

Pompey returned from the Third Mithridatic War at the end of 62 BC. In the interim, before his arrival back in Italy, the senate had successfully suppressed a conspiracy and insurrection led by a senator, Lucius Sergius Catalina, to overthrow that year's consuls. In the aftermath of the conspiracy, which was abetted by popular discontent, the Senate moved legislation to temper unrest in Italy: expanding the grain dole and implementing other much needed reforms. Pompey, landing in Brundisium, publicly dismissed his troops, indicating that no desire to follow Sulla's example and dominate the republic by force, as some conservative senators had feared. He celebrated a splendid triumph and then attempted to have his eastern settlements passed by the Senate; ratification, even with the backing of his a friendly consul, was not forthcoming due to the opposition of Lucullus, Crassus, and Cato the Younger. Settlement of Pompey's veterans on lands was also received coolly and delayed.

After the election of Julius Caesar as one of the consuls of 59 BC, Pompey and Caesar, along with Crassus, engaged in a political alliance (misleadingly dubbed the First Triumvirate). The alliance proved to the great benefit of the three men: Caesar passed legislation to distribute state lands as poor relief while also providing land for Pompey's veterans; he also had Pompey's eastern settlements ratified; for Crassus, he secured relief for tax farmers and a place on agrarian commission. Caesar won, for himself, the political support needed to acquire a profitable provincial command in Gaul and secure his political future.

Attempting first to pass portions of his programme through the Senate, Caesar found the curia obstinate. He thus unveiled his alliance with Pompey and Crassus and moved his legislation before the people instead. Political opposition to the allies was immense; Caesar's co-consul in 59 BC, Marcus Calpurnius Bibulus, along Cato and other supporters, attempted to obstruct enactment of Caesar's legislation, forcing the allies to use intimidation and force. The obstructive tactics, producing popular indignation against Caesar and his allies, were successful and greatly weakened their popular support.

Caesar also facilitated the election of the former patrician Publius Clodius Pulcher to the tribunate for 58. Clodius set about depriving Caesar's senatorial enemies of two of their more obstinate leaders in Cato and Cicero. Clodius was a bitter opponent of Cicero because Cicero had testified against him in a sacrilege case. Clodius attempted to try Cicero for executing citizens without a trial during the Catiline conspiracy, resulting in Cicero going into self-imposed exile and his house in Rome being burnt down. Clodius also passed a bill that forced Cato to lead the invasion of Cyprus which would keep him away from Rome for some years. Clodius also passed a law to expand the previous partial grain subsidy to a fully free grain dole for citizens.

During his term as praetor in the Iberian Peninsula (modern Portugal and Spain), Pompey's contemporary Julius Caesar defeated two local tribes in battle. After his term as consul in 59, he was appointed to a five-year term as the proconsular Governor of Cisalpine Gaul (part of current northern Italy), Transalpine Gaul (current southern France) and Illyria (part of the modern Balkans). Not content with an idle governorship, Caesar strove to find reason to invade Gaul (modern France and Belgium), which would give him the dramatic military success he sought. When two local tribes began to migrate on a route that would take them near (not into) the Roman province of Transalpine Gaul, Caesar had the barely sufficient excuse he needed for his Gallic Wars, fought between 58 and 49.

Caesar defeated large armies at major battles 58 and 57. In 55 and 54 he made two expeditions into Britain, the first Roman to do so. Caesar then defeated a union of Gauls at the Battle of Alesia, completing the Roman conquest of Transalpine Gaul. By 50, all of Gaul lay in Roman hands.

Clodius formed armed gangs that terrorised the city and eventually began to attack Pompey's followers, who in response funded counter-gangs formed by Titus Annius Milo. The political alliance of the triumvirate was crumbling. Domitius Ahenobarbus ran for the consulship in 55 promising to take Caesar's command from him. Eventually, the triumvirate was renewed at Lucca. Pompey and Crassus were promised the consulship in 55, and Caesar's term as governor was extended for five years.
Beginning in the summer of 54, a wave of political corruption and violence swept Rome. This chaos reached a climax in January of 52 BC, when Clodius was murdered in a gang war by Milo.

In 53, Crassus launched a Roman invasion of the Parthian Empire (modern Iraq and Iran). After initial successes, he marched his army deep into the desert; but here his army was cut off deep in enemy territory, surrounded and slaughtered at the Battle of Carrhae in which Crassus himself perished. The death of Crassus removed some of the balance in the Triumvirate and, consequently, Caesar and Pompey began to move apart. While Caesar was fighting in Gaul, Pompey proceeded with a legislative agenda for Rome that revealed that he was at best ambivalent towards Caesar and perhaps now covertly allied with Caesar's political enemies. Pompey's wife, Julia, who was Caesar's daughter, died in childbirth. This event severed the last remaining bond between Pompey and Caesar. In 51, some Roman senators demanded that Caesar not be permitted to stand for consul unless he turned over control of his armies to the state, which would have left Caesar defenceless before his enemies. Caesar chose civil war over laying down his command and facing trial.

Caesar's Civil War and dictatorship

On 1 January 49, an agent of Caesar presented an ultimatum to the senate. The ultimatum was rejected, and the senate then passed a resolution which declared that if Caesar did not lay down his arms by July of that year, he would be considered an enemy of the Republic. Meanwhile, the senators adopted Pompey as their new champion against Caesar. On 7 January of 49, the senate passed a senatus consultum ultimum, which vested Pompey with dictatorial powers. Pompey's army, however, was composed largely of untested conscripts.

On 10 January, Caesar with his veteran army crossed the river Rubicon, the legal boundary of Roman Italy beyond which no commander might bring his army, in violation of Roman laws, and by the spring of 49 swept down the Italian peninsula towards Rome. Caesar's rapid advance forced Pompey, the consuls and the senate to abandon Rome for Greece. Caesar entered the city unopposed. Afterwards Caesar turned his attention to the Pompeian stronghold of Hispania (modern Spain) but decided to tackle Pompey himself in Greece. Pompey initially defeated Caesar, but failed to follow up on the victory, and was decisively defeated at the Battle of Pharsalus in 48, despite outnumbering Caesar's forces two to one, albeit with inferior quality troops. Pompey fled again, this time to Egypt, where he was murdered.

Pompey's death did not end the civil war, as Caesar's many enemies fought on. In 46 Caesar lost perhaps as much as a third of his army, but ultimately came back to defeat the Pompeian army of Metellus Scipio in the Battle of Thapsus, after which the Pompeians retreated yet again to Hispania. Caesar then defeated the combined Pompeian forces at the Battle of Munda.

With Pompey defeated and order restored, Caesar wanted to achieve undisputed control over the government. The powers which he gave himself were later assumed by his imperial successors. His assumption of these powers decreased the authority of Rome's other political institutions.

Caesar held both the dictatorship and the tribunate, and alternated between the consulship and the proconsulship. In 48, Caesar was given permanent tribunician powers. This made his person sacrosanct, gave him the power to veto the senate, and allowed him to dominate the Plebeian Council. In 46, Caesar was given censorial powers, which he used to fill the senate with his own partisans. Caesar then raised the membership of the Senate to 900. This robbed the senatorial aristocracy of its prestige, and made it increasingly subservient to him. While the assemblies continued to meet, he submitted all candidates to them for election, as well as all bills for enactment. Thus, the group became powerless and were unable to oppose him.

Caesar's assassination 

Caesar began to prepare for a war against the Parthian Empire. Since his absence from Rome would limit his ability to install his own consuls, he passed a law that allowed him to appoint all magistrates, and later all consuls and tribunes. This transformed the magistrates from representatives of the people to representatives of the dictator.

Caesar was now the primary figure of the Roman state, enforcing and entrenching his powers. His enemies feared that he had ambitions to become an autocratic ruler. Arguing that the Roman Republic was in danger, a group of senators led by Gaius Cassius and Marcus Brutus hatched a conspiracy and assassinated Caesar at a meeting of the Senate on 15 March 44. Most of the conspirators were senators, who had a variety of economic, political, or personal motivations for carrying out the assassination. Many were afraid that Caesar would soon resurrect the monarchy and declare himself king. Others feared loss of property or prestige as Caesar carried out his land reforms in favor of the landless classes. Virtually all the conspirators fled the city after Caesar's death in fear of retaliation.

Second Triumvirate

The civil wars that followed destroyed what was left of the Republic.

After the assassination, Caesar's three most important associates, Marcus Antonius (Mark Antony), Caesar's co-consul, Gaius Octavianus (Octavian), Caesar's adopted son and great-nephew, and Marcus Lepidus, Caesar's magister equitum, formed an alliance. Known as the Second Triumvirate, they held powers that were nearly identical to the powers that Caesar had held under his constitution. As such, the Senate and assemblies remained powerless, even after Caesar had been assassinated. The conspirators were then defeated at the Battle of Philippi in 42. Although Brutus defeated Octavian, Antony defeated Cassius, who committed suicide. Brutus did likewise soon afterwards.

Following Philippi, Rome's territories were divided between the triumvirs but the agreement was fragile and could not withstand internal jealousies and ambitions. Antony detested Octavian and spent most of his time in the East, while Lepidus favoured Antony but felt himself obscured by both his colleagues. Following the defeat of Sextus Pompeius, a dispute between Lepidus and Octavian regarding the allocation of lands broke out. Octavian accused Lepidus of usurping power in Sicily and of attempted rebellion and, in 36 BC, Lepidus was forced into exile in Circeii and stripped of all his offices except that of pontifex maximus. His former provinces were awarded to Octavian.

Antony, meanwhile, married Caesar's lover, Cleopatra of Ptolemaic Egypt, intending to use the fabulously wealthy Egypt as a base to dominate Rome. The ambitious Octavian built a power base of patronage and then launched a campaign against Antony. Another civil war subsequently broke out between Octavian on one hand and Antony and Cleopatra on the other. This final civil war culminated in the latter's defeat at Actium in 31 BC; Octavian's forces would then chase Antony and Cleopatra to Alexandria, where they would both commit suicide in 30 BC.

Octavian was granted a series of special powers including sole "imperium" within the city of Rome, permanent consular powers and credit for every Roman military victory, since all future generals were assumed to be acting under his command. In 27 Octavian was granted the use of the names "Augustus", indicating his primary status above all other Romans, "Princeps", which he used to refer to himself as in public, and he adopted the title "Imperator Caesar" making him the first Roman Emperor.

Constitutional system

The constitutional history of the Roman Republic began with the revolution which overthrew the monarchy in 509 BC, and ended with constitutional reforms that transformed the Republic into what would effectively be the Roman Empire, in 27 BC. The constitution of the Roman Republic was a constantly-evolving, unwritten set of guidelines and principles passed down mainly through precedent, by which the government and its politics operated.

Senate

The senate's ultimate authority derived from the esteem and prestige of the senators. This esteem and prestige was based on both precedent and custom, as well as the caliber and reputation of the senators. The senate passed decrees, which were called senatus consulta. These were officially "advice" from the senate to a magistrate. In practice, however, they were usually followed by the magistrates. The focus of the Roman senate was usually directed towards foreign policy. Though it technically had no official role in the management of military conflict, the senate ultimately was the force that oversaw such affairs. This was due to the senate's explicit power over the state's budget and in military affairs. The power of the senate expanded over time as the power of the legislative assemblies declined, and the senate took a greater role in ordinary law-making. Its members were usually appointed by Roman Censors, who ordinarily selected newly elected magistrates for membership in the senate, making the senate a partially elected body. During times of military emergency, such as the civil wars of the 1st century, this practice became less prevalent, as the Roman Dictator, Triumvir or the senate itself would select its members. Towards the end of the Republic, the senate could enact a senatus consultum ultimum in times of emergency, instead of appointing a dictator.

Legislative assemblies

The legal status of Roman citizenship was limited and was a vital prerequisite to possessing many important legal rights such as the right to trial and appeal, to marry, to vote, to hold office, to enter binding contracts, and to special tax exemptions. An adult male citizen with the full complement of legal and political rights was called "optimo jure." The optimo jure elected their assemblies, whereupon the assemblies elected magistrates, enacted legislation, presided over trials in capital cases, declared war and peace, and forged or dissolved treaties. There were two types of legislative assemblies. The first was the comitia ("committees"), which were assemblies of all optimo jure. The second was the concilia ("councils"), which were assemblies of specific groups of optimo jure.

Citizens were organized on the basis of centuries and tribes, which would each gather into their own assemblies. The Comitia Centuriata ("Centuriate Assembly") was the assembly of the centuries (i.e., soldiers). The president of the Comitia Centuriata was usually a consul. The centuries would vote, one at a time, until a measure received support from a majority of the centuries. The Comitia Centuriata would elect magistrates who had the imperium powers (consuls and praetors). It also elected censors. Only the Comitia Centuriata could declare war, and ratify the results of a census. It also served as the highest court of appeal in certain judicial cases.

The assembly of the tribes (i.e., the citizens of Rome), the Comitia Tributa, was presided over by a consul, and was composed of 35 tribes. The tribes were not ethnic or kinship groups, but rather geographical subdivisions. The order that the thirty-five tribes would vote in was selected randomly by lot. Once a measure received support from a majority of the tribes, the voting would end. While it did not pass many laws, the Comitia Tributa did elect quaestors, curule aediles, and military tribunes. The Plebeian Council was identical to the assembly of the tribes, but excluded the patricians. They elected their own officers, plebeian tribunes and plebeian aediles. Usually a plebeian tribune would preside over the assembly. This assembly passed most laws, and could also act as a court of appeal.

Magistrates

Each republican magistrate held certain constitutional powers. Each was assigned a provincia by the Senate. This was the scope of that particular office holder's authority. It could apply to a geographic area or to a particular responsibility or task. The powers of a magistrate came from the people of Rome (both plebeians and patricians). The imperium was held by both consuls and praetors. Strictly speaking, it was the authority to command a military force. In reality, however, it carried broad authority in the other public spheres such as diplomacy, and the justice system. In extreme cases, those with the imperium power were able to sentence Roman Citizens to death. All magistrates also had the power of coercitio (coercion). This was used by magistrates to maintain public order by imposing punishment for crimes. Magistrates also had both the power and the duty to look for omens. This power could also be used to obstruct political opponents.

One check on a magistrate's power was called Collega (collegiality). Each magisterial office would be held concurrently by at least two people. Another such check was provocatio. While in Rome, all citizens were protected from coercion, by provocatio, which was an early form of due process. It was a precursor to habeas corpus. If any magistrate tried to use the powers of the state against a citizen, that citizen could appeal the decision of the magistrate to a tribune. In addition, once a magistrate's one-year term of office expired, he would have to wait ten years before serving in that office again. This created problems for some consuls and praetors, and these magistrates would occasionally have their imperium extended. In effect, they would retain the powers of the office (as a promagistrate), without officially holding that office.

The consuls of the Roman Republic were the highest ranking ordinary magistrates. Each served for one year. They retained several elements of the former kingly regalia, such as the toga praetexta, and the fasces, which represented the power to inflict physical punishment. Consular powers included the kings' former "power to command" (imperium) and appointment of new senators. Consuls had supreme power in both civil and military matters. While in the city of Rome, the consuls were the head of the Roman government. They would preside over the senate and the assemblies. While abroad, each consul would command an army. His authority abroad would be nearly absolute. Praetors administered civil law and commanded provincial armies. Every five years, two censors were elected for an 18-month term, during which they would conduct a census. During the census, they could enroll citizens in the senate, or purge them from the senate. Aediles were officers elected to conduct domestic affairs in Rome, such as managing public games and shows. The quaestors would usually assist the consuls in Rome, and the governors in the provinces. Their duties were often financial.

Since the tribunes were considered to be the embodiment of the plebeians, they were sacrosanct. Their sacrosanctity was enforced by a pledge, taken by the plebeians, to kill any person who harmed or interfered with a tribune during his term of office. It was a capital offense to harm a tribune, to disregard his veto, or to otherwise interfere with him. In times of military emergency, a dictator would be appointed for a term of six months. Constitutional government would be dissolved, and the dictator would be the absolute master of the state. When the dictator's term ended, constitutional government would be restored.

Military

Rome's military secured Rome's territory and borders, and helped to impose tribute on conquered peoples. Rome's armies had a formidable reputation; but Rome also "produced [its] share of incompetents" and catastrophic defeats. Nevertheless, it was generally the fate of Rome's greatest enemies, such as Pyrrhus and Hannibal, to win early battles but lose the war.

Hoplite armies

During this period, Roman soldiers seem to have been modelled after those of the Etruscans to the north, who themselves are believed to have copied their style of warfare from the Greeks. Traditionally, the introduction of the phalanx formation into the Roman army is ascribed to the city's penultimate king, Servius Tullius (ruled 578–534). The front rank was composed of the wealthiest citizens, who were able to purchase the best equipment. Each subsequent rank consisted of those with less wealth and poorer equipment than the one before it.

The phalanx was effective in large, open spaces, but not on the hilly terrain of the central Italian peninsula. In the 4th century, the Romans replaced it with the more flexible manipular formation. This change is sometimes attributed to Marcus Furius Camillus and placed shortly after the Gallic invasion of 390; more likely, it was copied from Rome's Samnite enemies to the south, following the Second Samnite War (326–304).

Manipular legion

During this period, an army formation of around 5,000 men (of both heavy and light infantry) was known as a legion. The manipular army was based upon social class, age and military experience. Maniples were units of 120 men each drawn from a single infantry class. They were typically deployed into three discrete lines based on the three heavy infantry types:

They were armed with a sword and two throwing spears.
 The second line were the principes. They were armed and armoured in the same manner as the hastati, but wore a lighter coat of mail rather than a solid brass breastplate.
 The triarii formed the third line. They were the last remnant of the hoplite-style troops in the Roman army. They were armed and armoured like the principes, with the exception that they carried a lighter spear.

The three infantry classes may have retained some slight parallel to social divisions within Roman society, but at least officially the three lines were based upon age and experience rather than social class. Young, unproven men would serve in the first line, older men with some military experience would serve in the second line, and veteran troops of advanced age and experience would serve in the third line.

The heavy infantry of the maniples were supported by a number of light infantry and cavalry troops, typically 300 horsemen per manipular legion. The cavalry was drawn primarily from the richest class of equestrians. There was an additional class of troops who followed the army without specific martial roles and were deployed to the rear of the third line. Their role in accompanying the army was primarily to supply any vacancies that might occur in the maniples. The light infantry consisted of 1,200 unarmoured skirmishing troops drawn from the youngest and lower social classes. They were armed with a sword and a small shield, as well as several light javelins.

Rome's military confederation with the other peoples of the Italian peninsula meant that half of Rome's army was provided by the Socii, such as the Etruscans, Umbrians, Apulians, Campanians, Samnites, Lucani, Bruttii, and the various southern Greek cities. Polybius states that Rome could draw on 770,000 men at the beginning of the Second Punic War, of which 700,000 were infantry and 70,000 met the requirements for cavalry. Rome's Italian allies would be organized in alae, or wings, roughly equal in manpower to the Roman legions, though with 900 cavalry instead of 300.

A small navy had operated at a fairly low level after about 300, but it was massively upgraded about forty years later, during the First Punic War. After a period of frenetic construction, the navy mushroomed to a size of more than 400 ships on the Carthaginian ("Punic") pattern. Once completed, it could accommodate up to 100,000 sailors and embarked troops for battle. The navy thereafter declined in size.

The extraordinary demands of the Punic Wars, in addition to a shortage of manpower, exposed the tactical weaknesses of the manipular legion, at least in the short term. In 217, near the beginning of the Second Punic War, Rome was forced to effectively ignore its long-standing principle that its soldiers must be both citizens and property owners. During the 2nd century, Roman territory saw an overall decline in population, partially due to the huge losses incurred during various wars. This was accompanied by severe social stresses and the greater collapse of the middle classes. As a result, the Roman state was forced to arm its soldiers at the expense of the state, which it did not have to do in the past.

The distinction between the heavy infantry types began to blur, perhaps because the state was now assuming the responsibility of providing standard-issue equipment. In addition, the shortage of available manpower led to a greater burden being placed upon Rome's allies for the provision of allied troops. Eventually, the Romans were forced to begin hiring mercenaries to fight alongside the legions.

Legion after the reforms of Gaius Marius

In a process known as the Marian reforms, Roman consul Gaius Marius carried out a programme of reform of the Roman military. In 107, all citizens, regardless of their wealth or social class, were made eligible for entry into the Roman army. This move formalised and concluded a gradual process that had been growing for centuries, of removing property requirements for military service. The distinction among the three heavy infantry classes, which had already become blurred, had collapsed into a single class of heavy legionary infantry. The heavy infantry legionaries were drawn from citizen stock, while non-citizens came to dominate the ranks of the light infantry. The army's higher-level officers and commanders were still drawn exclusively from the Roman aristocracy.

Unlike earlier in the Republic, legionaries were no longer fighting on a seasonal basis to protect their land. Instead, they received standard pay, and were employed by the state on a fixed-term basis. As a consequence, military duty began to appeal most to the poorest sections of society, to whom a salaried pay was attractive. A destabilising consequence of this development was that the proletariat "acquired a stronger and more elevated position" within the state.

The legions of the late Republic were almost entirely heavy infantry. The main legionary sub-unit was a cohort of approximately 480 infantrymen, further divided into six centuries of 80 men each. Each century comprised 10 "tent groups" of 8 men. Cavalry were used as scouts and dispatch riders, rather than as battlefield forces. Legions also contained a dedicated group of artillery crew of perhaps 60 men. Each legion was normally partnered with an approximately equal number of allied (non-Roman) troops.

The army's most obvious deficiency lay in its shortage of cavalry, especially heavy cavalry. Particularly in the East, Rome's slow-moving infantry legions were often confronted by fast-moving cavalry-troops, and found themselves at a tactical disadvantage.

Following Rome's subjugation of the Mediterranean, its navy declined in size although it would undergo short-term upgrading and revitalisation in the late Republic to meet several new demands. Julius Caesar assembled a fleet to cross the English Channel and invade Britannia. Pompey raised a fleet to deal with the Cilician pirates who threatened Rome's Mediterranean trading routes. During the civil war that followed, as many as a thousand ships were either constructed or pressed into service from Greek cities.

Social structure

Citizen families were headed by the family's oldest male, the pater familias, who was lawfully entitled to exercise complete authority (patria potestas) over family property and all family members. Brutus, co-founder of the Republic, is supposed to have exercised the extreme form of this right when he executed his own sons for treachery. Citizenship offered legal protection and rights, but citizens who offended Rome's traditional moral code could be declared infamous, and lose certain legal and social privileges. Citizenship was also taxable, and undischarged debt was potentially a capital offence. A form of limited, theoretically voluntary slavery (debt bondage, or nexum) allowed wealthy creditors to negotiate payment of debt through bonded service. Poor, landless citizens of the lowest class (proletarii) might contract their sons to a creditor, patron or third party employer to obtain an income, or to pay off family debts. Nexum was only abolished when slave labour became more readily available, most notably during the Punic wars.

Slaves were simultaneously family members and family property. They could be bought, sold, acquired through warfare, or born and raised within their master's household. They could also buy their freedom with money saved or the offer of future services as a freedman or woman, and their sons could be eligible for citizenship; this degree of social mobility was unusual in the ancient world. Freed slaves and the master who freed them retained certain legal and moral mutual obligations. This was the bottom rung of one of Rome's fundamental social and economic institutions, the client-patron relationship. At the top rung were the senatorial families of the landowning nobility, both patrician and plebeian, bound by shifting allegiances and mutual competition. A plebiscite of 218 forbade senators and their sons to engage in substantial trade or money-lending. A wealthy equestrian class emerged, not subject to the same trading constraints as senators.

Citizen men and citizen women were expected to marry, produce as many children as possible, and improve – or at worst, conserve – their family's wealth, fortune, and public profile. Marriage offered opportunities for political alliance and social advancement. Patricians usually married in a form known as confarreatio, which transferred the bride from her father's absolute control or "hand" (manus) to that of her husband. Patrician status could only be inherited through birth; an early law, introduced by the reactionary Decemviri but rescinded in 445, sought to prevent marriages between patricians and plebeians; any resulting offspring may not have been legally recognised. Among ordinary plebeians, different marriage forms offered married women considerable more freedom than their patrician counterparts, until manus marriage was replaced by free marriage, in which the wife remained under the legal authority of her absent father, not her husband. Infant mortality was high. Towards the end of the Republic, the birthrate began to fall among the elite. Some wealthy, childless citizens resorted to adoption to provide male heirs for their estates, and to forge political alliances. Adoption was subject to the senate's approval; the notoriously unconventional patrician politician Publius Clodius Pulcher had himself and his family adopted into a plebeian clan, so that he could hold a plebeian tribunate.

Trade and economy

Farming

The Republic was created during a time of warfare, economic recession, food shortages, and plebeian debt. In wartime, plebeian farmers were liable to conscription. In peacetime, most depended on whatever cereal crops they could produce on small farming plots, allotted to them by the state, or by patrons. Soil fertility varied from place to place, and natural water sources were unevenly distributed throughout the landscape. In good years, a pleb small-holder might trade a small surplus, to meet his family's needs, or to buy the armatures required for his military service. In other years, crop failure through soil exhaustion, adverse weather, disease or military incursions could lead to poverty, unsupported borrowing, and debt. Nobles invested much of their wealth in ever-larger, more efficient farming units, exploiting a range of soil conditions through mixed farming techniques. As farming was labour-intensive, and military conscription reduced the pool of available manpower, over time the wealthy became ever more reliant upon the increasingly plentiful slave-labour provided by successful military campaigns. Large, well managed agricultural estates helped provide for clients and dependents, support an urban family home, and fund the owner's public and military career, in the form of cash for bribes and security for loans. Later Roman moralists idealised farming as an intrinsically noble occupation: Cincinnatus left off his ploughing reluctantly, to serve as dictator, and returned once his state duties were done.

In law, land taken by conquest was ager publicus (public land). In practise, much of it was exploited by the nobility, using slaves rather than free labour. Rome's expansionist wars and colonisations were at least partly driven by the land-hunger of displaced peasants, who must otherwise join the swelling, dependent population of urban plebs. At the end of the second Punic War, Rome added the fertile ager Campanus, suitable for intense cultivation of vines, olives and cereals. Like the grain-fields of Sicily – seized after the same conflict – it was likely farmed extra-legally by leading landowners, using slave-gangs. A portion of Sicily's grain harvest was sent to Rome as tribute, for redistribution by the aediles. The urban plebs increasingly relied on firstly subsidised, then free grain.

With the introduction of aqueducts (from 312), suburban market-farms could be supplied with run-off or waste aqueduct water. Perishable commodities such as flowers (for perfumes, and festival garlands), fresh grapes, vegetables and orchard fruits, and small livestock such as pigs and chickens, could be farmed close to municipal and urban markets. In the early 2nd century Cato the Elder tried to block the illicit tapping of rural aqueducts by the elite, who thus exploited the increased productivity of cheaply bought, formerly "dry" farmland; a law was duly passed, but fines for abuses, and taxes on profits, proved more realistic solutions than an outright ban. Food surpluses, no matter how obtained, kept prices low. Faced with increasing competition from provincial and allied grain suppliers, many Roman farmers turned to more profitable crops, especially grapes for wine production. By the late Republican era, Roman wine had been transformed from an indifferent local product for local consumption, to a major domestic and export commodity, with some renowned, costly and collectable vintages.

Roman writers have little to say about large-scale stock-breeding, but make passing references to its profitability. Drummond speculates that this focus on agriculture rather than livestock might reflect elite preoccupations with historical grain famines, or long-standing competition between agriculturalists and pastoralists. While agriculture was a seasonal practise, pasturage was a year-round requirement. Some of Republican Rome's early agricultural legislation sought to balance the competing public grazing rights of small farmers, the farming elite, and transhumant pastoralists, who maintained an ancient right to herd, graze and water their animals between low-lying winter pastures and upland summer pastures. From the early second century, transhumance was practised on a vast scale, as an investment opportunity. Though meat and hides were valuable by products of stock-raising, cattle were primarily reared to pull carts and ploughs, and sheep were bred for their wool, the mainstay of the Roman clothing industry. Horses, mules and donkeys were bred as civil and military transport. Pigs bred prolifically, and could be raised at little cost by any small farmer with rights to pannage. Their central dietary role is reflected by their use as sacrificial victims in domestic cults, funerals, and cults to agricultural deities.

Religion

Republican Rome's religious practises harked back to Rome's quasi-mythical history. Romulus, a son of Mars, founded Rome after Jupiter granted him favourable bird-signs regarding the site. Numa Pompilius, second king of Rome, had established Rome's basic religious and political institutions after direct instructions from the gods, given through augury, dreams and oracle. Each king thereafter was credited with some form of divinely approved innovation, adaptation or reform. An Imperial-era source claims that the Republic's first consul, Brutus, effectively abolished human sacrifice to the goddess Mania, instituted by the last king, Tarquinius.

Romans acknowledged the existence of innumerable deities who controlled the natural world and human affairs. Every individual, occupation and location had a protective tutelary deity, or sometimes several. Each was associated with a particular, highly prescriptive form of prayer and sacrifice. Piety (pietas) was the correct, dutiful and timely performance of such actions. The well-being of each Roman household was thought to depend on daily cult to its Lares and Penates (guardian deities, or spirits), ancestors, and the divine generative essence embodied within its pater familias. A family which neglected its religious responsibilities could not expect to prosper.

The well-being of the Roman state depended on its state deities, whose opinions and will could be discerned by priests and magistrates, trained in augury, haruspicy, oracles and the interpretation of omens. Impieties in state religion could produce expressions of divine wrath such as social unrest, wars, famines and epidemics, vitiate the political process, render elections null and void, and lead to the abandonment of planned treaties, wars and any government business. Accidental errors could be remedied by repeating the rite correctly, or by an additional sacrifice; outright sacrilege threatened the bonds between the human and divine, and carried the death penalty. As divine retribution was invoked in the lawful swearing of oaths and vows, oath-breakers forfeited their right to divine protection, and might be killed with impunity.

Roman religious authorities were unconcerned with personal beliefs or privately funded cults, unless they offended natural or divine laws, or undermined the mos maiorum (roughly, "the way of the ancestors"); the relationship between gods and mortals should be sober, contractual, and of mutual benefit. Undignified grovelling, excessive enthusiasm (superstitio) and secretive practises were "weak minded" and morally suspect. Magical practises were officially banned, as attempts to subvert the will of the gods for personal gain, but were probably common among all classes. Private cult organisations that seemed to threaten Rome's political and priestly hierarchy were investigated by the Senate, with advice from the priestly colleges. The Republic's most notable religious suppression was that of the Bacchanalia, a widespread, unofficial, enthusiastic cult to the Greek wine-god Bacchus. The cult organisation was ferociously suppressed, and its deity was absorbed within the official cult to Rome's own wine-god, Liber. The official recognition, adoption and supervision of foreign deities and practices, whether Etruscan, Sabine, Latin or colonial Greek, had been an important unitary feature in Rome's territorial expansion and dominance since the days of the kings. For example, king Servius Tullius had established an Aventine temple to Diana as a Roman focus for the Latin League.

The gods were thought to communicate their wrath (ira deorum) through prodigies (unnatural or aberrant phenomena). During the crisis of the Second Punic War an unprecedented number of reported prodigies were expiated, in more than twenty days of public ritual and sacrifices. In the same period, Rome recruited the "Trojan" Magna Mater (Great Mother of the Gods) to the Roman cause, "Hellenised" the native Roman cult to Ceres; and took control of the Bacchanalia festival in Rome and its allied territories. Following Rome's disastrous defeat at Cannae, the State's most prominent written oracle recommended the living burial of human victims in the Forum Boarium to placate the gods. Livy describes this "bloodless" human sacrifice as an abhorrent but pious necessity; Rome's eventual victory confirmed the gods' approval.

Starting in the mid-Republican era, some leading Romans publicly displayed special, sometimes even intimate relationships with particular deities. For instance, Scipio Africanus claimed Jupiter as a personal mentor. Some gentes claimed a divine descent, often thanks to a false etymology of their name; the Caecilii Metelli pretended to descend from Vulcan through his son Caeculus, the Mamilii from Circe through her granddaughter Mamilia, the Julii Caesares and the Aemilii from Venus through her grandsons Iulus and Aemylos. In the 1st century, Sulla, Pompey, and Caesar made competing claims for Venus' favour.

Priesthoods
With the abolition of monarchy, some of its sacral duties were shared by the consuls, while others passed to a Republican rex sacrorum (king of the sacred rites"), a patrician "king", elected for life, with great prestige but no executive or kingly powers. Rome had no specifically priestly class or caste. As every family's pater familias was responsible for his family's cult activities, he was effectively the senior priest of his own household. Likewise, most priests of public cult were expected to marry, produce children, and support their families. In the early Republic the patricians, as "fathers" to the Roman people, claimed the right of seniority to lead and control the state's relationship with the divine. Patrician families, in particular the Cornelii, Postumii and Valerii, monopolised the leading state priesthoods: the flamines of Jupiter, Mars and Quirinus, as well as the pontifices. The patrician Flamen Dialis employed the "greater auspices" (auspicia maiora) to consult with Jupiter on significant matters of State.

Twelve "lesser flaminates" (Flamines minores), were open to plebeians, or reserved to them. They included a Flamen Cerealis in service of Ceres, goddess of grain and growth, and protector of plebeian laws and tribunes. The plebs had their own forms of augury, which they credited to Marsyas, a satyr or silen in the entourage of Liber, plebeian god of grapes, wine, freedom and male fertility. The priesthoods of local urban and rustic Compitalia street-festivals, dedicated to the Lares of local communities, were open to freedmen and slaves, to whom "even the heavy-handed Cato recommended liberality during the festival"; so that the slaves, "being softened by this instance of humanity, which has something great and solemn about it, may make themselves more agreeable to their masters and be less sensible of the severity of their condition".

The Lex Ogulnia (300) gave patricians and plebeians more-or-less equal representation in the augural and pontifical colleges; other important priesthoods, such as the Quindecimviri ("The Fifteen"), and the epulones were opened to any member of the senatorial class. To restrain the accumulation and potential abuse of priestly powers, each gens was permitted one priesthood at any given time, and the religious activities of senators were monitored by the censors. Magistrates who held an augurate could claim divine authority for their position and policies. In the late Republic, augury came under the control of the pontifices, whose powers were increasingly woven into the civil and military cursus honorum. Eventually, the office of pontifex maximus became a de facto consular prerogative.

Some cults may have been exclusively female; for example, the rites of the Good Goddess (Bona Dea). Towards the end of the second Punic War, Rome rewarded priestesses of Demeter from Graeca Magna with Roman citizenship for training respectable, leading matrons assacerdotes of "Greek rites" to Ceres. Every matron of a family (the wife of its pater familias) had a religious duty to maintain the household fire, which was considered an extension of Vesta's sacred fire, tended in perpetuity by the chaste Vestal Virgins. The Vestals also made the sacrificial mola salsa employed in many State rituals, and represent an essential link between domestic and state religion. Rome's survival was thought to depend on their sacred status and ritual purity. Vestals found guilty of inchastity were "willingly" buried alive, to expiate their offence and avoid the imposition of blood-guilt on those who inflicted the punishment.

Temples and festivals

Rome's major public temples were contained within the city's sacred, augural boundary (pomerium), which had supposedly been marked out by Romulus, with Jupiter's approval. The Temple of Jupiter Optimus Maximus ("Jupiter, Best and Greatest") stood on the Capitoline Hill. Among the settled areas outside the pomerium was the nearby Aventine Hill. It was traditionally associated with Romulus' unfortunate twin, Remus, and in later history with the Latins, and the Roman plebs. The Aventine seems to have functioned as a place for the introduction of "foreign" deities. In 392, Camillus established a temple there to Juno Regina, Etruscan Veii's protective goddess. Later introductions include Summanus,  278, Vortumnus  264, and at some time before the end of the 3rd century, Minerva. While Ceres' Aventine temple was most likely built at patrician expense, to mollify the plebs, the patricians brought the Magna Mater ("Great mother of the Gods") to Rome as their own "Trojan" ancestral goddess, and installed her on the Palatine, along with her distinctively "un-Roman" Galli priesthood.

Romulus was said to have pitched his augural tent atop the Palatine. Beneath its southern slopes ran the sacred way, next to the former palace of the kings (Regia), the House of the Vestals and Temple of Vesta. Close by were the Lupercal shrine and the cave where Romulus and Remus were said to have been suckled by the she-wolf. On the flat area between the Aventine and Palatine was the Circus Maximus, which hosted chariot races and religious games. Its several shrines and temples included those to Rome's indigenous sun god, Sol, the moon-goddess Luna, the grain-storage god, Consus, and the obscure goddess Murcia. A temple to Hercules stood in the Forum Boarium, near the Circus starting gate. Every district (Vicus) of the city had a crossroads shrine to its own protective Lares.

Whereas Republican (and thereafter, Imperial) Romans marked the passage of years with the names of their ruling consuls, their calendars marked the anniversaries of religious foundations to particular deities, the days when official business was permitted (fas), and those when it was not (nefas). The Romans observed an eight-day week; markets were held on the ninth day. Each month was presided over by a particular, usually major deity. The oldest calendars were lunar, structured around the most significant periods in the agricultural cycle, and the religious duties required to yield a good harvest.

In the military

Before any campaign or battle, Roman commanders took auspices, or haruspices, to seek the gods' opinion regarding the likely outcome. Military success was achieved through a combination of personal and collective virtus (roughly, "manly virtue") and divine will. Triumphal generals dressed as Jupiter Capitolinus, and laid their victor's laurels at his feet. Religious negligence, or lack of virtus, provoked divine wrath and led to military disaster. Military oaths dedicated the oath-takers life to Rome's gods and people; defeated soldiers were expected to take their own lives, rather than survive as captives. Examples of devotio, as performed by the Decii Mures, in which soldiers offered and gave their lives to the Di inferi (gods of the underworld) in exchange for Roman victory were celebrated as the highest good.

Some of Republican Rome's leading deities were acquired through military actions. In the earliest years of the Republic, Camillus promised Veii's goddess Juno a temple in Rome as incentive for her desertion (evocatio). He conquered the city in her name, brought her cult statue to Rome "with miraculous ease" and dedicated a temple to her on the Aventine Hill. The first known temple to Venus was built to fulfil a vow made by Q. Fabius Gurges during battle against the Samnites. Following Rome's disastrous defeat by Carthage in the Battle of Lake Trasimene (217), Rome laid siege to Eryx, a Sicillian ally of Carthage. The city's patron deity, whom the Romans recognised as a warlike version of Venus, was "persuaded" to change her allegiance and was rewarded with a magnificent temple on the Capitoline Hill, as one of Rome's twelve Dii consentes. Venus Victrix was thought to grant her favourites a relatively easy victory, worthy of an ovation and myrtle crown.

Cities, towns and villas

City of Rome

Life in the Roman Republic revolved around the city of Rome, and its seven hills. The most important governing, administrative and religious institutions were concentrated at its heart, on and around the Capitoline and Palatine Hills. The city rapidly outgrew its original sacred boundary (pomerium), and its first city walls. Further growth was constrained by an inadequate fresh-water supply. Rome's first aqueduct (312) built during the Punic wars crisis, provided a plentiful, clean supply. The building of further aqueducts led to the city's expansion and the establishment of public baths (thermae) as a central feature of Roman culture. The city also had several theatres, gymnasiums, and many taverns and brothels. Living space was at a premium. Some ordinary citizens and freedmen of middling income might live in modest houses but most of the population lived in apartment blocks (insulae, literally "islands"), where the better-off might rent an entire ground floor, and the poorest a single, possibly windowless room at the top, with few or no amenities. Nobles and rich patrons lived in spacious, well-appointed town houses; they were expected to keep "open house" for their peers and clients. A semi-public atrium typically functioned as a meeting-space, and a vehicle for display of wealth, artistic taste, and religious piety. Noble atria were also display areas for ancestor-masks (imagines).

Most Roman towns and cities had a forum and temples, as did the city of Rome itself. Aqueducts brought water to urban centres. Landlords generally resided in cities and left their estates in the care of farm managers.

Culture

Clothing

The basic Roman garment was the Greek-style tunic, worn knee-length and short-sleeved (or sleeveless) for men and boys, and ankle-length and long-sleeved for women and girls. The toga was distinctively Roman. It was thought to have begun during the early Roman kingdom, as a plain woolen "shepherd's wrap", worn by both sexes, all classes, and all occupations, including the military. By the middle to late Republic, citizen women had abandoned it for the less bulky, Greek-style stola, and the military used it only for off-duty ceremonies. The toga became a mark of male citizenship, a statement of social degree. Convention also dictated the type, colour and style of calcei (ankle-boots) appropriate to each level of male citizenship; red for senators, brown with crescent-shaped buckles for equites, and plain tanned for plebs.

The whitest, most voluminous togas were worn by the senatorial class. High ranking magistrates, priests and citizen's children were entitled to a purple-bordered toga praetexta. Triumphal generals wore an all-purple, gold-embroidered toga picta, associated with the image of Jupiter and Rome's former kings – but only for a single day; Republican mores simultaneously fostered competitive display and attempted its containment, to preserve at least a notional equality between peers, and reduce the potential threats of class envy. Togas, however, were impractical for physical activities other than sitting in the theatre, public oratory, and attending the salutiones ("greeting sessions") of rich patrons. Most Roman citizens, particularly the lower class of plebs, seem to have opted for more comfortable and practical garments, such as tunics and cloaks.

Luxurious and highly coloured clothing had always been available to those who could afford it, particularly women of the leisured classes. There is material evidence for cloth-of-gold (lamé) as early as the 7th century. By the 3rd century, significant quantities of raw silk was being imported from China. The Lex Oppia (215), which restricted personal expenditure on such luxuries as purple clothing, was repealed in 195, after a mass public protest by wealthy Roman matrons. Tyrian purple, as a quasi-sacred colour, was officially reserved for the border of the toga praetexta and for the solid purple toga picta; but towards the end of the Republic, the notorious Verres was wearing a purple pallium at all-night parties, not long before his trial, disgrace and exile for corruption.

For most Romans, even the simplest, cheapest linen or woolen clothing represented a major expense. Worn clothing was passed down the social scale until it fell to rags, and these in turn were used for patchwork. Wool and linen were the mainstays of Roman clothing, idealised by Roman moralists as simple and frugal. Landowners were advised that female slaves not otherwise occupied should be producing homespun woolen cloth, good enough for clothing the better class of slave or supervisor. Cato the Elder recommended that slaves be given a new cloak and tunic every two years; coarse rustic homespun would likely be "too good" for the lowest class of slave, but not good enough for their masters. For most women, the carding, combing, spinning and weaving of wool were part of daily housekeeping, either for family use or for sale. In traditionalist, wealthy households, the family's wool-baskets, spindles and looms were positioned in the semi-public reception area (atrium), where the mater familias and her familia could thus demonstrate their industry and frugality; a largely symbolic and moral activity for those of their class, rather than practical necessity.

As the Republic wore on, its trade, territories and wealth increased. Roman conservatives deplored the apparent erosion of traditional, class-based dress distinctions, and an increasing Roman appetite for luxurious fabrics and exotic "foreign" styles among all classes, including their own. Towards the end of the Republic, the ultra-traditionalist Cato the Younger publicly protested the self-indulgent greed and ambition of his peers, and the loss of Republican "manly virtues", by wearing a "skimpy" dark woolen toga, without tunic or footwear.

Food and dining

Modern study of the dietary habits during the Republic are hampered by various factors. Few writings have survived, and because different components of their diet are more or less likely to be preserved, the archaeological record cannot be relied on. Cato the Elder's De Agri Cultura includes several recipes and his suggested "Rations for the hands". The list of ingredients includes cheese, honey, poppy seeds, coriander, fennel, cumin, egg, olives, bay leaves, laurel twig, and anise. He gives instructions for kneading bread, making porridge, Placenta cake, brine, various wines, preserving lentils, planting asparagus, curing ham, and fattening geese and squab. The Roman poet Horace mentions another Roman favorite, the olive, in reference to his own diet, which he describes as very simple: "As for me, olives, endives, and smooth mallows provide sustenance." Meat, fish, fruits, nuts and vegetables were a part of the Roman diet at all levels of society. Romans valued fresh fruit, and had a diverse variety available to them.

Wine was considered the basic drink, consumed at all meals and occasions by all classes and was quite inexpensive. Cato once advised cutting his rations in half to conserve wine for the workforce. Many types of drinks involving grapes and honey were consumed as well. Drinking on an empty stomach was regarded as boorish and a sure sign for alcoholism, the debilitating physical and psychological effects of which were known to the Romans. Accusations of alcoholism were used to discredit political rivals. Prominent Roman alcoholics included Marcus Antonius, and Cicero's own son Marcus (Cicero Minor). Even Cato the Younger was known to be a heavy drinker.

Education and language

Rome's original native language was early Latin, the language of the Italic Latins. Most surviving Latin literature is written in Classical Latin, a highly stylised and polished literary language which developed from early and vernacular spoken Latin, from the 1st century. Most Latin speakers used Vulgar Latin, which significantly differed from Classical Latin in grammar, vocabulary, and eventually pronunciation.

Following various military conquests in the Greek East, Romans adapted a number of Greek educational precepts to their own fledgling system. Strenuous, disciplined physical training helped prepare boys of citizen class for their eventual citizenship and a military career. Girls generally received instruction from their mothers in the art of spinning, weaving, and sewing.
Schooling in a more formal sense was begun around 200. Education began at the age of around six, and in the next six to seven years, boys and girls were expected to learn the basics of reading, writing and counting. By the age of twelve, they would be learning Latin, Greek, grammar and literature, followed by training for public speaking. Effective oratory and good Latin were highly valued among the elite, and were essential to a career in law or politics.

Arts

In the 3rd century, Greek art taken as the spoils of war became popular, and many Roman homes were decorated with landscapes by Greek artists.

Over time, Roman architecture was modified as their urban requirements changed, and the civil engineering and building construction technology became developed and refined. The Roman concrete has remained a riddle, and even after more than 2,000 years some Roman structures still stand magnificently. The architectural style of the capital city was emulated by other urban centers under Roman control and influence.

Literature

Early Roman literature was influenced heavily by Greek authors. From the mid-Republic, Roman authors followed Greek models, to produce free-verse and verse-form plays and other in Latin; for example, Livius Andronicus wrote tragedies and comedies. The earliest Latin works to have survived intact are the comedies of Plautus, written during the mid-Republic. Works of well-known, popular playwrights were sometimes commissioned for performance at religious festivals; many of these were satyr plays, based on Greek models and Greek myths. The poet Naevius may be said to have written the first Roman epic poem, although Ennius was the first Roman poet to write an epic in an adapted Latin hexameter. However, only fragments of Ennius' epic, the Annales, have survived, yet both Naevius and Ennius influenced later Latin epic, especially Virgil's Aeneid. Lucretius, in his On the Nature of Things, explicated the tenets of Epicurean philosophy.

The politician, poet and philosopher Cicero's literary output was remarkably prolific and so influential on contemporary and later literature that the period from 83 BC to 43 BC has been called the "Age of Cicero". His oratory set new standards for centuries, and continues to influence modern speakers, while his philosophical works, which were, for the most part, Cicero's Latin adaptations of Greek Platonic and Epicurean works influenced many later philosophers. Other prominent writers of this period include the grammarian and historian of religion Varro, the politician, general and military commentator Julius Caesar, the historian Sallust and the love poet Catullus.

Sports and entertainment

The city of Rome had a place called the Campus Martius ("Field of Mars"), which was a sort of drill ground for Roman soldiers. Later, the Campus became Rome's track and field playground. In the campus, the youth assembled to play and exercise, which included jumping, wrestling, boxing and racing.  Equestrian sports, throwing, and swimming were also preferred physical activities.  In the countryside, pastimes included fishing and hunting.  Board games played in Rome included dice (Tesserae or Tali), Roman Chess (Latrunculi), Roman Checkers (Calculi), Tic-tac-toe (Terni Lapilli), and Ludus duodecim scriptorum and Tabula, predecessors of backgammon. Other activities included chariot races, and musical and theatrical performances.

See also
 Democratic empire

Notes

References

Citations

Ancient sources 

  
 
 
 Julius Caesar, Commentarii de Bello Civili (Commentaries on the Civil War).
 Cicero, Brutus, De Divinatione, De Oratore, In Verrem, Philippicae.
 
 
 
 
 
 
 
 Tacitus, Annales, Historiae.

Cited sources 
General references

 
 

General histories (chronological)

 
 
 
 
 
 
 
 
 
 
 
 
 
 
 
 
 
 
 
 
 
 
 
 
 
 
 
 
 
 
 
 
 
 

Specific subjects

External links 

 The Roman Republic from In Our Time (BBC Radio 4)
 Nova Roma – Educational Organization a working historical reconstruction of the Roman Republic
 Roman Empire History

 
Ancient Italian history
Italian states
Former countries in Europe
Former countries in Africa
Former countries in Western Asia
Countries in ancient Africa
States and territories established in the 6th century BC
509 BC
6th-century BC establishments in Italy
States and territories disestablished in the 1st century BC
1st-century BC disestablishments
27 BC
1st millennium BC in Italy
Former republics